Ishania is a genus of Central American ant spiders first described in 1925 by Ralph Vary Chamberlin. Originally placed in Agelenidae, it was later moved to Zodariidae in 1965.

Species
, it contains the following species:

Ishania absoluta (Gertsch & Davis, 1940) — Mexico
Ishania aztek Jocqué & Baert, 2002 — Mexico
Ishania centrocavata Jocqué & Baert, 2002 — Mexico
Ishania chicanna Jocqué & Baert, 2002 — Mexico
Ishania chichimek Jocqué & Baert, 2002 — Mexico
Ishania firma Jocqué & Baert, 2002 — Mexico
Ishania gertschi Jocqué & Baert, 2002 — Mexico
Ishania guerrero Jocqué & Baert, 2002 — Mexico
Ishania hessei (Chamberlin & Ivie, 1936) — Mexico
Ishania huastek Jocqué & Baert, 2002 — Mexico
Ishania ivieorum Jocqué & Baert, 2002 — Mexico
Ishania latefossulata Jocqué & Baert, 2002 — Mexico
Ishania maya Jocqué & Baert, 2002 — Mexico
Ishania minuta Jocqué & Baert, 2002 — Honduras
Ishania mixtek Jocqué & Baert, 2002 — Mexico
Ishania mundella (Gertsch & Davis, 1940) — Mexico
Ishania nayarit Jocqué & Baert, 2002 — Mexico
Ishania oaxaca Jocqué & Baert, 2002 — Mexico
Ishania ocosingo Jocqué & Baert, 2002 — Mexico
Ishania olmek Jocqué & Baert, 2002 — Mexico
Ishania paxoides Jocqué & Baert, 2002 — Mexico, Honduras
Ishania perforata Jocqué & Baert, 2002 — Guatemala
Ishania protecta Jocqué & Baert, 2002 — Mexico
Ishania querci Jocqué & Baert, 2002 — Mexico
Ishania real Jocqué & Baert, 2002 — Mexico
Ishania relativa Jocqué & Baert, 2002 — Mexico
Ishania simplex Jocqué & Baert, 2002 — Mexico
Ishania tarask Jocqué & Baert, 2002 — Mexico
Ishania tentativa Chamberlin, 1925 — Costa Rica
Ishania tinga (F. O. Pickard-Cambridge, 1899) — Mexico
Ishania tormento Jocqué & Baert, 2002 — Mexico
Ishania totonak Jocqué & Baert, 2002 — Mexico
Ishania vacua Jocqué & Baert, 2002 — Mexico
Ishania xilitla Jocqué & Baert, 2002 — Mexico
Ishania zapotek Jocqué & Baert, 2002 — Mexico

References

Zodariidae
Araneomorphae genera
Spiders of Mexico
Spiders of Central America